The lesser hedgehog tenrec (Echinops telfairi) is a species of mammal in the family Tenrecidae. It is the only species in the genus Echinops and is named in honour of Charles Telfair. It is endemic to Madagascar. Its natural habitats are subtropical or tropical dry forests, shrubland, and shrubland and dry savanna.

Description
The lesser hedgehog tenrec is a small, stout-bodied animal similar to a hedgehog, hence the name. Their tails are short, their limbs and muzzles are of moderate length, and their ears are prominent. The entire dorsum is covered with sharp spines. Color is usually yellow buff; individuals range from near white to almost black.

Lesser hedgehog tenrecs (like all tenrecs) have a cloaca (common uro-genital opening), like a bird or a reptile.

Behavior
This tenrec is terrestrial. It spends its daytime hours resting under a log, a pile of branches, leaves, straws or in a hollow tree, although trees are widely scattered in its native habitat. In hot weather, it sleeps with its body extended, but otherwise lies in a curled position to rest. It enters a state of torpor in the winter time.

They mostly feed upon insects but may prey on small vertebrates, and usually forage alone, except for a mother with her young.

Breeding is known to occur in October but may depend on warm weather first arousing the animals from winter torpor and on an available food supply.

The Lesser hedgehog tenrec is a host of the Acanthocephalan intestinal parasite Promoniliformis ovocristatus.

Captivity
The lesser hedgehog tenrec has become popular in the exotic pet industry.

References
 Simon and Schuster's Guide to Mammals

Further reading 
 Suárez R., Villalón A., Künzle H., Mpodozis J. (2009) "Transposition and Intermingling of Gαi2 and Gαo Afferences into Single Vomeronasal Glomeruli in the Madagascan Lesser Tenrec Echinops telfairi". PLoS ONE 4(11): e8005.

External links

View the Lesser hedgehog tenrec genome in Ensembl.

Afrosoricida
Mammals of Madagascar
Mammals described in 1838
Taxa named by William Charles Linnaeus Martin
Taxonomy articles created by Polbot